General Sir Peter John Frederick Whiteley,  (13 December 1920 – 2 February 2016) was a British Royal Marines officer. He served as Commandant General Royal Marines from 1975 to 1977 and then as Commander-in-Chief Allied Forces Northern Europe from 1977 to 1979.

Early life
Whiteley was born on 13 December 1920 in Stansted Mountfitchet, Essex. He was educated at Bishop's Stortford College, then an all-boys private school in Bishop's Stortford, Hertfordshire, and at Bembridge School, a now closed all-boys independent school on the Isle of Wight.

Whiteley was awarded a Newspaper Proprietors' Association scholarship to study at the University of London. However, with the outbreak of the Second World War, he decided to join the military rather than continue his studies.

Military career
At the outbreak of the Second World War, Whiteley volunteered for the Royal Air Force. However, his application was rejected due to his poor eyesight. He then applied to the Royal Marines and was accepted, and he began his officer training. He was commissioned as a probationary second lieutenant on 1 January 1940. On 20 March 1942, his commission was confirmed and he was given the rank of lieutenant with seniority from 14 June 1941. During the war, he served aboard , a battleship, and aboard , a light cruiser. During the latter part of the war, he served with the British Pacific Fleet, which was fighting against the Japanese. He could claim to have fired some of the last shots of the war: on 15 August 1945, during an attack by a Japanese aircraft on his ship, he was attempting to shoot it down when the news of the ceasefire with Japan was received.

Whiteley was selected to become commanding officer of 42 Commando in 1965. He was then appointed commander of 3 Commando Brigade in 1968. He became Commandant General Royal Marines in 1975 and Commander-in-Chief Allied Forces Northern Europe in 1977.

Later life
Whiteley served as Lieutenant Governor of Jersey from 1979 to 1984, and was Deputy Lieutenant of Devon.

Whiteley died on 2 February 2016.

References

|-

|-

1920 births
2016 deaths
British military personnel of the Indonesia–Malaysia confrontation
British military personnel of the Malayan Emergency
Deputy Lieutenants of Devon
Governors of Jersey
Knights Grand Cross of the Order of the Bath
Officers of the Order of the British Empire
People educated at Bembridge School
People educated at Bishop's Stortford College
Royal Marines generals
Royal Marines personnel of World War II
People from Stansted Mountfitchet
Military personnel from Essex